The HIS3 gene, found in the Saccharomyces cerevisiae yeast, encodes a protein called Imidazoleglycerol-phosphate dehydratase which catalyses the sixth step in histidine biosynthesis.  It is analogous to hisB in Escherichia coli.

Exploits 
Mutations in Escherichia coli'''s analogous gene, hisB allows researchers to select only those individuals expressing the HIS3 gene included on a plasmid. The HIS3 gene is coupled to a certain promoter which can only be activated by successful binding of the relevant transcription factors. This is used in certain methods of bacterial two-hybrid screening to allow the survival of E. coli'' in which a desired protein-DNA or protein-protein interaction is taking place.

References 

Saccharomyces cerevisiae genes